North Tonawanda is a city in Niagara County, New York, United States. The population was 31,568 at the 2010 census. It is part of the Buffalo–Niagara Falls Metropolitan Statistical Area. The city is named after Tonawanda Creek, its south border.

Tonawanda in the Seneca tongue means "Swift Running Water". Tonawanda Creek, which flows into the Niagara River, once had large stretches of rapids (see Rapids, New York) until it was tamed with the construction of the Erie Canal.

The city also calls itself "The Lumber City," due to its past primary industry and once was the largest port on the Great Lakes during the height of the Erie Canal. Along Goundry Street are mansions built for the lumber barons, including 208 Goundry Street, called "Kent Place", designed by Stanford White. Many of the local residents refer to the city as "The Jewel of Niagara County" due to its geographical setting between the Niagara River and Erie Canal. It is also home to the 2009 Class AA NYS Football Champion Lumberjacks. Street signs on the borders of town welcome visitors to "The Home Of The Carousel".

History
After the first settlers arrived in 1809, North Tonawanda became part of the town of Wheatfield, New York in Niagara County, from May 1836. An abortive attempt at a village containing portions in two counties and two towns from January 1854 until April 1857, it was part of the Niagara County/Town of Wheatfield component, with the other portion in Erie County and the Town of Tonawanda. The experiment was abandoned after New York State removed the village's North Tonawanda component. Oral history claims a dispute between merchants was the cause, but the combination of communities in two counties and two towns was unwieldy. After becoming a village on May 8, 1865 (still in the Town of Wheatfield, but as part of Martinsville, New York), North Tonawanda was incorporated as a City on April 24, 1897.

North Tonawanda is on the north side of the Erie Canal/Tonawanda Creek, across from Erie County, New York and the communities of the City of Tonawanda and the Town of Amherst. The Town of Wheatfield borders North Tonawanda on the north and east; the Niagara River serves as its western border, as Tonawanda Creek is its southern border. North Tonawanda is the second largest city in Niagara County, after Niagara Falls, New York.

North Tonawanda is known as "The Lumber City," because it was from the mid-19th century through the 1970s, a lumber transportation and forwarding center of significance because of the ready availability of lumber. It was the birthplace of the Herschell-Spillman Company/Allan Herschell Co., one of the leading manufacturers of carousels in America and is now the home of the Herschell Carrousel Factory Museum. In 1888, Herschell attracted expatriate Belgian Eugene de Kleist to North Tonawanda, who started the North Tonawanda Barrel Organ Factory to produce band organs. Taken over in 1909 by the Rudolph Wurlitzer Company after De Kleist became mayor of North Tonawanda in 1906, Wurlitzer became one of the largest musical instrument manufacturing plants in the world. The Ray H. Bennett Lumber Co., one of more than 150 lumber companies to have called North Tonawanda home, produced kit homes sold around the nation and Canada for 70 years. Richardson Boat, Buffalo Bolt, Durez Chemical, National Grinding Wheel, Taylor Devices, International Paper, Tonawanda Iron & Steel, Riverside Chemical, and hundreds of other successful manufacturing businesses called North Tonawanda home.

The Railroad Museum of the Niagara Frontier occupies a 1923 Erie Railroad station on Oliver Street. The Riviera Theater and Performing Arts Center on Webster Street, in a restored Italian Renaissance-style building, features plays, concerts, movies and other events, and its 1926 "Mighty Wurlitzer" organ is featured in monthly organ concerts. The theater is one of only a handful in the United States with projectors capable of showing nitrate film prints in common use before about 1951. The Ghostlight Theatre is a community theater in a century-old church. The former Carnegie Library is home to the Carnegie Art Center. An E. B. Green designed building houses the Buffalo Suzuki Strings Musical Arts Center. An active arts community has developed in the downtown area as well. The North Tonawanda History Museum no longer occupies the former G. C. Murphy Co. store building on Webster Street in the heart of the Downtown Historic District.

Parks in North Tonawanda include Veteran's Park, which has a monument to U.S. Seabees, one to the U.S. Marines, and is working on one to Vietnam War Veterans; Gateway Harbor Park, along the Erie Canal, the site of the annual Canal Fest in July and free concerts and other activities; the  Gratwick-Riverside Park along the Niagara River; and Pine Woods Park, Mayor's Park, and the North Tonawanda Botanical Gardens with a boat launch.

The Buffalo Norsemen played their home games in North Tonawanda during their existence.

Geography
North Tonawanda is located at  (43.041006, -78.868920).

The Erie Canal defines the southern and the majority of the eastern borders of the city, with the rest of the eastern border made up of Sweeney Street and Old Falls Boulevard. Niagara Falls Boulevard (US Route 62) defines the northeastern border of the city. The majority of the northern border of the city is a line that runs east-west just above Forbes Terrace, mostly paralleling Ruie Road, with the rest of the northern border being a short northwesterly line that runs from Ward Road to Witmer Road. The western edge of the city is defined by the Niagara River and a line that runs just west of and parallel to Witmer Road. Also, at the southwest corner of the city is Tonawanda Island, which is separated from the mainland by the Little River (Part of the East Branch of the Niagara River) and is part of the city.

The edge of North Tonawanda is sometimes hard to find, because the southern parts of both the Towns of Wheatfield and Pendleton use the same zip code as North Tonawanda, 14120.

Climate

Buildings
It is home to many historic mansions and an historic cemetery.

The North Tonawanda City Market, established in 1908, is the oldest farmer's market in Niagara County. It is open three days a week year round but busiest in the summer and early fall, when more than 70 area farmers sell there.

The city has a number of properties on the National Register of Historic Places.

The old Wurlitzer Organ Factory which is now leased to various light industrial, high technology, and commercial businesses.

Historic Sites 
The following are the historic sites in North Tonawanda of such significance as to be listed on the National Register of Historic Places.

Demographics

As of the census of 2000, there were 33,262 people, 13,671 households, and 8,981 families residing in the city. The population density was 3,293.2 people per square mile (1,271.5/km2). There were 14,425 housing units at an average density of 1,428.2 per square mile (551.4/km2). The racial makeup of the city was 97.86% White, 0.29% African American, 0.34% Native American, 0.53% Asian, 0.01% Pacific Islander, 0.29% from other races, and 0.68% from two or more races. Hispanic or Latino of any race were 1.09% of the population.

There were 13,671 households, out of which 30.2% had children under the age of 18 living with them, 50.8% were married couples living together, 11.1% had a female householder with no husband present, and 34.3% were non-families. 29.5% of all households were made up of individuals, and 12.8% had someone living alone who was 65 years of age or older. The average household size was 2.43 and the average family size was 3.03.

In the city, the population was spread out, with 23.7% under the age of 18, 8.6% from 18 to 24, 28.9% from 25 to 44, 23.1% from 45 to 64, and 15.6% who were 65 years of age or older. The median age was 38 years. For every 100 females, there were 94.6 males. For every 100 females age 18 and over, there were 90.6 males.

The median income for a household in the city was $39,154, and the median income for a family was $50,219. Males had a median income of $36,551 versus $25,129 for females. The per capita income for the city was $19,264. 7.2% of the population and 5.4% of families were below the poverty line. Out of the total people living in poverty, 9.1% are under the age of 18 and 6.1% are 65 or older.

Schools
The public schools of North Tonawanda are the North Tonawanda High School, North Tonawanda Middle School, Drake Elementary School, North Tonawanda Intermediate School, Spruce Elementary School, and Ohio Elementary School.

Essential services
 North Tonawanda City School District
 North Tonawanda Police Department
 North Tonawanda Public Library
 DeGraff Memorial Hospital, part of Kaleida Health
 North Tonawanda Fire Department (Combination Fire Dept); The department consist of 38 full-time career firefighters and volunteer firefighters from the Columbia Hook & Ladder Co. #1, Active Hose Co. #2, Live Hose Co. #4, Rescue Fire Co. #5, Gratwick Hose Co. #6, and the Sweeney Hose Co. #7. The NTFD has five stations and 6 apparatuses: 3 engines (Engine-4, Engine-6, and Engine-7); a ladder truck (Truck-1); a light rescue (Rescue-1); and a command car (Car-10). Staffing consists of four platoons (1-4).

Notable people

 Ted Barrett, MLB umpire
 Rudy Bozak, notable engineer
 Cindy Bradley, jazz trumpet player
 Jim Britton, retired MLB pitcher
 Rita Kogler Carver, studio designer
 Eugene de Kleist, organ builder
 Maryalice Demler, former Miss New York
 Tonio di Paolo, opera singer
 Ed Harmon, professional football player
 Bret Hoffmann, death metal vocalist
 Jim Hurtubise, automobile racer
 Edward C. Kuhn, U.S. military coat of arms designer
 William Larson, photographer
 Robert Mangold, artist
 George D. Maziarz, politician
 Bernard Joseph McLaughlin, Auxiliary Bishop of Buffalo Diocese
 Hans Oldag, German-born American long-distance runner
 Jamin Olivencia, professional wrestler
 Robert G. Ortt, politician
 Gladys Parker, comic strip artist
 Lewis S. Payne, former New York State Senator
 Roman Piskor, NFL football player
 James Rand Jr., industrialist
 Stan Rojek, major-league baseball player
 Geoff Sanderson, former NHL player
 Paul Schaus, sledge hockey gold medalist
 Robin Schimminger, politician.
 Don Smith, Olympic rower
 Henry P. Smith III, politician
 Paul Van Arsdale, hammered dulcimer player 
 Christopher J. Waild, screenwriter
 Andy Williams, guitarist in Every Time I Die
 Phil Fasciana (Death Metal Guitarist)

See also

 Tonawanda (disambiguation)

References

External links
 City of North Tonawanda webpage
 North Tonawanda History Museum

 
Cities in New York (state)
Buffalo–Niagara Falls metropolitan area
Cities in Niagara County, New York
Sundown towns in New York (state)
New York placenames of Native American origin